Koanophyllon villosum, the Florida Keys thoroughwort, or abre camino, is a species of flowering plant in the family Asteraceae. It grows in southern Florida, Cuba, the Bahamas, Hispaniola, Jamaica, and the Islas de la Bahía (part of Honduras).

Koanophyllon villosum is a shrub up to 200 cm (80 inches) tall. Flower heads contain up to 15 pink or white disc flowers but no ray flowers.

References

External links
Dave's Garden
Native Florida Wildflowers,  Florida Shrub Thoroughwort - Koanophyllon villosum  photos etc.
photo of herbarium specimen at University of South Florida

villosum
Flora of the Caribbean
Flora of Honduras
Flora of Florida
Plants described in 1788
Flora without expected TNC conservation status